Vesle Tavleøya is the larger island of the two northernmost of Sjuøyane - the other being Rossøya, north of Nordaustlandet, Svalbard. Vesle Tavleøya is situated some 7 km northeast of Phippsøya, the largest island of the islands, separated by Sjuøyflaket sound.

References

 Norwegian Polar Institute Place names in Norwegian polar areas

Islands of Svalbard